Aaron Spangler (born 1971, Minneapolis, Minnesota) is a sculptor and printmaker who lives and works in Park Rapids, Minnesota.

Life 
He attended the Minneapolis College of Art and Design, earning his BFA degree in 1993. He is represented by Horton Gallery in New York City.

Spangler's sculptures typically consist of carved solid blocks of basswood that are finished with coats of black gesso and graphite. Spangler carves his sculptures using mallets, chisels, and a Dremel-style rotary tool. Ken Johnson commented that, ""You don't see much wood carving in elite Chelsea galleries. An antiquated craft with little relevance to modern technologies of communication or to a competitive, fast-paced contemporary art market...so it is exciting to come upon the large, intricate reliefs". Spangler works three-dimensionally and in bas-relief, a challenging and intricate medium. His work is often concerned with "war's devastation and its potential as a metaphor for psychological conflict" as well as "anarchy in rural America". His sculptures seek to envision a "fascinating and frightening revolution against passive consumerism 'of the people, by the people'" Multi-faceted, his work reveals more upon second and third glances; shifting scale and perspective propelling the viewer deeper into the psyche of the piece, leading one critic to claim that Spangler piled "images and motifs, just like ancient Romans heaped up captured armor and weapons as trophies". Spangler has transformed "a marginalized craft typically associated with bearded, plaid-shirted gentlemen of a certain age into a conduit for the mythology of the Midwest without diminishing its tactility or symbolic richness".

Notable Exhibitions
2011 Gothic, Southeastern Center for Contemporary Art Center, Winston-Salem, NC (with Allison Taylor)
2011 A Simple Heart: Der Kleiner Mann (with Dana Frankfort), La Montagne Gallery, Boston, MA
2010 Government Whore, Horton Gallery, New York City
2009 Paranoid Defenders, Galerie Michael Janssen, Berlin, DE
2007 Zach Feuer Gallery, New York City
2006 Kantor/Feuer Gallery, Los Angeles
2005 Zach Feuer Gallery, New York City
2003 Sundown, Rare Plus Gallery, New York City
2002 Dissident Aggressor, The Soap Factory, Minneapolis, MN
2000 City Limits, Franklin Art Works, Minneapolis, MN
1999 Aaron Spangler: New Work, Thomas Barry Fine Arts, Minneapolis, MN

Awards and Grants
2010 McKnight Artist Fellowship for Visual Artists
1998 Minnesota State Arts Board Fellowship
1997 Jerome Foundation Travel and Study Grant

Collections
Armand Hammer Museum of Art and Culture Center at UCLA, Los Angeles
Art Gallery of Ontario, Toronto, Canada
Minneapolis Institute of Art
The Progressive Collection, Cleveland
Richard Massey Foundation, New York City
Rubell Family Collection, Miami
Saatchi Gallery, London
Takashi Murakami, Tokyo
Walker Art Center, Minneapolis
Wellington Management Collection, Boston

References

External links
Horton Gallery
Spangler: American Gothic
Government Whore, Horton Gallery

21st-century American sculptors
21st-century American male artists
American male sculptors
American printmakers
Artists from Minneapolis
Minneapolis College of Art and Design alumni
1971 births
Living people
People from Park Rapids, Minnesota
Sculptors from Minnesota